Per Roger Anton Axelsson (born January 16, 1986), is a Swedish former professional ice hockey winger. He played for Frölunda HC and Timrå IK in the Swedish Hockey League (SHL).

Anton is the younger brother of P. J. Axelsson.

Playing career
Born in Kungälv, Axelsson moved to Västra Frölunda as a youngster. He was drafted 192nd overall in the 2004 NHL Entry Draft by the Detroit Red Wings while playing for Frölunda HC U-20 team. He advanced to the senior team for the 2005–06 season and spent two seasons there before signing a two-year contract with Timrå in April 2007. After four years with the club, he headed back to Frölunda HC, where he played until the end of the 2015–16 campaign, in which he helped win the Swedish national championship and the Champions Hockey League title.

Being plagued by injuries for a long time, he announced the end of his playing career in late October 2016.

Career statistics

Regular season and playoffs

International

Awards and honors

References

External links

1986 births
Living people
People from Kungälv Municipality
Detroit Red Wings draft picks
Frölunda HC players
Swedish ice hockey left wingers
Timrå IK players
Sportspeople from Västra Götaland County